Manor is a ghost town in Washington Township, Montgomery County, Ohio, United States. Originally, Manor was founded as a railway stop between Centerville and Lytle on the Cincinnati, Lebanon, and Northern Railway.  It was located on Social Row Road just one mile east of Dayton-Lebanon Pike (State Route 48).

Rosedale
Between 1898 and 1918, the town was mapped as Rosedale.  In 1900, Rosedale was recorded as a small town.

Big Bend Park (Manor Station)
Centerville-Washington Park District maintains the grounds where the station once stood. An old railroad track bed is preserved in the park, which is also a walking trail.  The southbound rail splits at this station and combines again near Lytle station.

References

Geography of Montgomery County, Ohio
Ghost towns in Ohio